The Robinson River is a river in Australia's Northern Territory.

Description

It is river dominated in nature with a wave dominated delta and has an area of  covered with mangroves.

Flora and fauna
Stands of Cycas angulata are found along the lower reaches of the river.

A total of 33 species of fish are found in the river including: sailfin glassfish, barred grunter, snub-nosed garfish, fly-specked hardyhead, mouth almighty, golden flathead goby, spangled perch, barramundi, mangrove jack, chequered rainbowfish, giant gudgeon, spotted scat, freshwater longtom, and seven-spot archerfish.

The critically endangered largetooth sawfish has been caught in the river mouth. The endangered gulf snapping turtle has been found in the upper reaches of the Robinson.

History
The traditional owners of the area are the Garawa and the Gunindiri peoples.

The river was named by Ludwig Leichhardt during his expedition from Queensland to Port Essington in 1845. Leichhardt named the river after one of the supporters of the expedition, Joseph Phelps Robinson, a well known philanthropist, banker and Quaker.

In 1992 the Robinson River pastoral lease and surrounding areas were handed back to the Garawa people who had started working on the land claim in 1980.

See also

References 

Rivers of the Northern Territory
Gulf of Carpentaria